Dinemandra is a monotypic genus of flowering plants belonging to the family Malpighiaceae. The only species is Dinemandra ericoides.

Its native range is Chile.

References

Malpighiaceae
Malpighiaceae genera
Monotypic Malpighiales genera